Lisa Raymond and Rennae Stubbs were the defending champions and successfully defended their title, by defeating Cara Black and Elena Likhovtseva 6–3, 5–7, 7–6(7–4) in the final.

Seeds

Draw

Draw

References
 Official results archive (ITF)
 Official results archive (WTA)

State Farm Women's Tennis Classic
2002 WTA Tour